Jaclyn Bernstein (born August 15, 1978) is an American actress known for her roles in The Bradys, The People Next Door, and others. She won a Young Artist Award in 1986 for her role in The Twilight Zone and another in 1988 for her role in The Bradys.

Filmography

Film

Television

References 

American actresses
1978 births
Actresses from Los Angeles
Actresses from California
Living people